Spencer Creek is a creek in Flamborough, Ontario. Banks of the Creek is made up of residential homes, farms and business.

Recreation  
Traveling through the area using Highway 97.

Camping 
The area is home to many trailer parks and more prominently the Spencer Gorge/Webster's Falls Conservation Area and Valens Conservation Area,

See also 
 Adventure travel
 Bruce Trail
 Cambridge, Ontario
 Puslinch, Ontario
 Spencer Creek Trail

Citations

Grand River (Ontario)